William Russel may refer to:

 William Russell (English actor) (born 1924), English actor
 William B. Russel (born 1945), American chemical engineer

See also
 William Russell (disambiguation)